Haploscythris chloraema is a moth in the family Scythrididae. It was described by Edward Meyrick in 1887. It is found in Botswana, Madagascar, Namibia and South Africa.

The wingspan is about 13 mm. The forewings are pale grey, irrorated (sprinkled) with grey. The plical and first discal stigmata are well marked, blackish, the plical obliquely anterior, the second discal only indicated by two or three blackish scales. The hindwings are grey.

References

Scythrididae
Moths described in 1887